"Hey, That's No Way to Say Goodbye" is a song by Leonard Cohen.  It was first released in November 1967, in a version by Judy Collins on her album Wildflowers.  The following month, Cohen's own version was issued on his debut album Songs of Leonard Cohen.

Cohen wrote the song when staying at the Penn Terminal Hotel on 34th Street in New York City in 1966.  He wrote:The room is too hot. I can't open the windows. I am in the midst of a bitter quarrel with a blonde woman. The song is half-written in pencil but it protects us as we manoeuvre, each of us, for unconditional victory.  I am in the wrong room. I am with the wrong woman.

It was covered in 1969 by Roberta Flack on her debut album First Take, and has been recorded by many other singers, notably Lianne La Havas,  also the Vogues on their last album together in 1970. Feist, Ariel Engle and Daniela Gesundheit performed the song at the 2017 Tower of Song: A Memorial Tribute to Leonard Cohen concert

References

Leonard Cohen songs
1967 songs